This is a list of films produced in mainland China ordered by year of release in the 1980s. For an alphabetical listing of Chinese films see :Category:Chinese films

1980

1981

1982

1983

1984

1985

1986

1987

1988

1989

Mainland Chinese Film Production Totals

See also
Cinema of China
Best 100 Chinese Motion Pictures as chosen by the 24th Hong Kong Film Awards

References

External links
IMDb list of Chinese films

1980s
Films
Lists of 1980s films

zh:中国大陆电影